Trevor John Meath (born 20 March 1944) is an English former footballer who made 110 appearances in the Football League playing for Walsall and Lincoln City, whom he joined in October 1969 for a £6,000 fee. His career ended prematurely after an injury sustained in a match in October 1971. A midfielder, he began his career in non-league football with Darlaston.

References

1944 births
Living people
Sportspeople from Wednesbury
English footballers
Association football midfielders
Darlaston Town F.C. players
Walsall F.C. players
Lincoln City F.C. players
English Football League players